The Black Enforcer is a 1972 Hong Kong dramatic action film directed by Ho Meng Hua.  The original Hong Kong Mandarin release title is Hei ling guan (Cantonese: Hak leng goon). It was released in Hong Kong cinemas on 28 January 1972.

Cast
 Tang Ching
 Wang Ping 
 Tien Feng as Kuan Yun-fei 
 Jen Tsu Fang   
 Ching Wan Wong  
 Tung Li as Kang Hua
 Chao Hsiung 
 Kwang-ho Choi 
 Seong Choi as Tsao Hsing
 Erh Chun
 Ko Ching
 Lai Wen
 Cliff Lok as Chin Tung
 No Tsai

References

External links
 

1972 films
Hong Kong action drama films
1970s action films
1970s Mandarin-language films
Shaw Brothers Studio films
Films directed by Ho Meng Hua
1970s Hong Kong films